Márton Balázs (July 17, 1929 – April 13, 2016) was a Romanian mathematician of Hungarian descent.

He was born in Lueta, Odorhei County (now Harghita County), Romania. After graduating from high school in Odorheiu Secuiesc, he got his undergraduate degree from Babeș-Bolyai University, with a specialization in mathematical physics.

References 

1929 births
2016 deaths
Romanian people of Hungarian descent
People from Harghita County
Romanian mathematicians
Romanian educational theorists
Babeș-Bolyai University alumni
Academic staff of Babeș-Bolyai University
Budapest University of Technology and Economics alumni